Middlefork is the name of the following places in the U.S. state of Indiana:
Middlefork, Clinton County, Indiana
Middlefork, Jefferson County, Indiana
Middlefork Township, Vermilion County, Illinois